Asiab Rural District is a rural district (dehestan) in the Central District of Omidiyeh County, Khuzestan Province, Iran. At the 2006 census, its population was 3,496, in 693 families.  The rural district has 10 villages.

References 

Rural Districts of Khuzestan Province
Omidiyeh County